Fort William ("The Garrison") formerly and  (Lit. "The Black Garrison of Inverlochy"),, formerly is a town in Lochaber in the Scottish Highlands, located on the eastern shore of Loch Linnhe. At the 2011 census, Fort William had a population of 10,459, making it the second largest settlement in both the Highland council area, and the whole of the Scottish Highlands; only the city of Inverness has a larger population.

Fort William is a major tourist centre  on the Road to the Isles, with Glen Coe just to the south,  to the east, and Glenfinnan to the west. It is a centre for hillwalking and climbing due to its proximity to Ben Nevis and many other Munro mountains. It is also known for its nearby downhill mountain bike track. It is the start/end of both the West Highland Way (Milngavie – Fort William) and the Great Glen Way (a walk/cycle way Fort William–Inverness).

Around 726 people (7.33% of the population) can speak Gaelic.

Origins
The earliest recorded settlement on the site is a Cromwellian wooden fort built in 1654 as a base for the New Model Army to "pacify" Clan Cameron after the Wars of the Three Kingdoms. The post-1688 revolution fort was named Fort William after William of Orange, who ordered that it be built to control some of the Scottish clans. The settlement that grew around it was called Maryburgh, after his wife Mary II of England. This settlement was later renamed Gordonsburgh, and then Duncansburgh before being renamed Fort William, this time after Prince William, Duke of Cumberland. There have been various suggestions over the years to rename the town (for example, to Invernevis).

The origin of the Gaelic name for Fort William, is not recorded but could be a loanword  from the English garrison, having entered common usage some time after the royal garrison was established, during the reign of William of Orange or perhaps after the earlier Cromwellian fort,

History
Historically, the Fort William area of Lochaber was Clan Cameron country, and there were a number of mainly Cameron settlements in the area (such as Blarmacfoldach). Before the building of the fort, Inverlochy was the main local settlement and was also the site of two battles—the first Battle of Inverlochy in 1431 and the second Battle of Inverlochy in 1645.

The town grew in size as a settlement when the fort was constructed to control the population after Oliver Cromwell's invasion during the Wars of the Three Kingdoms, and then to suppress the Jacobite risings after the 1688 overthrow of the House of Stuart.

During the 1745 Jacobite Rising, known as the Forty-Five, Fort William was besieged for two weeks by the Jacobite forces, from 20 March to 3 April 1746. However, although the Jacobites had captured both of the other forts in the chain of three Great Glen fortifications (Fort Augustus and the original Fort George), they failed to take Fort William.

In 1934, the Laggan Dam on the River Spean was completed as part of the Lochaber hydroelectric scheme by Balfour Beatty for the British Aluminium Company. The supervising engineers were the firm of C. S. Meik and William Halcrow, now known as the Halcrow Group. The dam was built to power the aluminum smelter.

On 2 June 2006, a fire destroyed McTavish's Restaurant in Fort William High Street along with the two shops which were part of the building. The restaurant had been open since the 1970s and before that the building had been Fraser's Cafe since the 1920s. Development work began in 2012 on new hotel accommodation and street-level shops, which opened in 2014.

Liberty House Group
In November 2016, Sanjeev Gupta's Liberty House Group purchased the Lochaber aluminum plant from the Rio Tinto Group.

On 3 April 2021, it came to light during Gupta's financial troubles involving Greensill Capital that the Jahama Highland Estates (formerly the "Alcan Estate") had been purchased in 2016 as part of the Rio Tinto Mines deal for the Lochaber aluminium plant, because the furnace requires so much power that the smelter is located near a hydroelectric plant, which drains the basin of the  Estate. 

The Estate includes the north face of Ben Nevis. According to reports, the Scottish National Party mandated that the Estate never be split from the hydro plant and aluminium smelter, but Gupta ignored them and placed ownership of the Estate in a company that is domiciled on the Isle of Man. The 2016 deal was worth £330 million and was guaranteed by the UK Chancellor of the Exchequer. Conservative finance spokesperson Murdo Fraser was critical of the alleged breach of the SNP agreement and urged the SNP to "take whatever steps are necessary to protect public funds".

Proposed development
A "Waterfront" development was proposed by the council, but failed due to lack of public support. The development would have included a hotel, shops, and housing. The proposed development was slated to take 7 years by the local council, but opponents of the project said that it was unlikely to be completed before 2020. It was announced in April 2010 that the project had been abandoned.

Geography

Originally based on the still-extant village of Inverlochy, the town lies at the southern end of the Great Glen. Fort William lies near the head of Loch Linnhe, one of Scotland's longest sea lochs, beside the mouth of the rivers Nevis and Lochy. They join in the intertidal zone and briefly become one river before discharging to the sea. The town and its suburbs are surrounded by mountains. It is also on the shore of Loch Eil. It is close to Ben Nevis, the highest mountain in the British Isles, Glen Nevis, and the town of Achnaphubuil, which is on the opposite shore of the loch. The original railway station, which was opened on August 7, 1894, was at the south end of the town. The consequence of this decision was that the town was separated from the lochside by railway tracks until the 1970s, when the present by-pass was built, and the station was re-located to the north end.

The town is centred on the High Street, which was pedestrianised in the 1990s. Off this, there are several squares: Monzie Square (named after the Cameron Campbells of Monzie, Perthshire, former landowners in the town); Station Square, where the long-since demolished railway station used to be; Gordon Square (named after the Gordons, who in the late 18th century owned land where the town now stands, when the town was named Gordonsburgh); and Cameron Square—formerly known as Town Hall Square. There is also Fraser Square, which is not so square-like, since it now opens out into Middle Street, but which still houses the Imperial Hotel.

The main residential areas of the town are unseen from the High Street and from the A82 main road. Upper Achintore and the Plantation spread steeply uphill from above the high street.

Inverlochy, Claggan, An-Aird, Lochyside, Caol, Banavie and Corpach outwith (i.e. outside) the town are the other main residential areas. These areas are built on much flatter land than the town.

Fort William is the northern end of the West Highland Way, a long-distance route which runs  through the Scottish Highlands to Milngavie, on the outskirts of Glasgow, and the start/end point of the Great Glen Way, which runs between Fort William and Inverness.

The viaduct has become known to millions in recent years as the "Harry Potter Bridge" after it featured in the films of the books by J.K. Rowling, specifically Harry Potter and the Chamber of Secrets. Glenfinnan has also been used in Charlotte Gray and Highlander.

Just outside the town is a large aluminium plant once operated by Alcan and powered by the Lochaber hydroelectric scheme, in its day the biggest tunnelling project in the world. This was formerly served by the Lochaber Narrow Gauge Railway better known locally as the Puggy Line.

Transport

The West Highland Line passes through Fort William. Owing to the difficult terrain in the area, the line from Glasgow to the south, enters from the north-east. Trains from Glasgow to Mallaig, the terminus of the line, have to reverse at Fort William railway station.

An overnight train, the Caledonian sleeper, has its terminus at Fort William; this service is known colloquially as "The Deerstalker". The stands for local buses and express coaches are on MacFarlane Way adjacent to the railway station.

The Caledonian Canal connects the Scottish east coast at Inverness with the west coast at Corpach near Fort William.

The Corran Ferry  crosses Loch Linnhe, connecting the A82 to A861.

Fort William is located on the A82. The closest motorway access is at junction 12 of the M90 near Perth,  to the south-east.

Sport

Mountain biking
Just outside the town, parallel to the Nevis Range Gondola, there is a large downhill mountain bike track which attracts thousands of visitors every year, including international competitors and fans.

Each year since 2002, Fort William has hosted a round of UCI Mountain Bike World Cup and, in 2007, it hosted the UCI Mountain Bike & Trials World Championships ('The Worlds'). Also a trials competition is held at the various courses at the bottom.

Fort William has hosted the World Endurance Mountain Bike Organisation (WEMBO) solo 24 hour championship in 2014 and again in 2018. The event consists of riders racing for a full 24 hours and is won by the rider who has completed the greater number of laps.

Motorcycle trials
Fort William is the home of the Scottish Six Day Motorcycle Trial (SSDT); it is held annually in the first full week of May. It attracts many competitors from all across the globe and, in 2011, the event celebrated its centenary year.

Others
Fort William has two major shinty teams: Fort William Shinty Club and Kilmallie Shinty Club. It also has a football team, Fort William F.C., that competes in the Scottish North Caledonian League and plays home games at Claggan Park. There is also a cricket club at Fort William that participates in the North of Scotland Cricket Association league (NoSCA).

In addition, the town is home to Lochaber Rugby Club and to the Lochaber Yacht Club, a Community Amateur Sports Club that was founded in 1954. The town also has one golf club, called Fort William Golf Club, which has eighteen holes and is open all-year-round; it also hosts weekly competitions.

As a film location
Movies filmed in or near Fort William include Being Human, Braveheart, Highlander, Restless Natives, Harry Potter and Rob Roy. The TV series Rockface was filmed mainly around Fort William and some scenes of Monarch of the Glen were filmed around Lochaber, although mostly near Newtonmore.  Local Hero shot the internal Houston scenes in Fort William.

Festivals
In a celebration of mountains and the culture that surrounds them, and in recognition of the importance of climbing and walking tourism to the town, the Fort William Mountain Festival is held there each year. For a number of years, this volunteer-led festival has concentrated mostly around film but, starting in the Year of Highland Culture – Highland 2007, its scope was widened, and it dropped the word 'film' from its title.

Education
Lochaber High School is the local high school and serves a large catchment area which includes the surrounding villages.
West Highland College is part of the University of the Highlands & Islands. It hosts the School of Adventure Studies (SOAS) offering both FE courses & HE honours degrees.

Notable people
Hugh Cochrane – recipient of the Victoria Cross
Charles Kennedy – former leader of the Liberal Democrat party and former Liberal Democrat Member of Parliament (MP) for Ross, Skye and Lochaber. Although born in Inverness, he was brought up and educated in Fort William.
Danny Alexander – the former Chief Secretary to the Treasury and Liberal Democrat MP for Inverness, Nairn, Badenoch and Strathspey. Brought up in Invergarry, a small village near Fort William.
Justin Ryan – interior decorator and television presenter, although born in Glasgow, was brought up in Fort William.
Allan MacDonald – Roman Catholic priest, folklore collector, pastor in South Uist & Eriskay and major figure in modern Scottish Gaelic literature, was born and brought up in Fort William.
John Wood - recipient of the Victoria Cross
Barry Hutchison – author
John McGinlay – former Scotland international footballer
Duncan Shearer – former Scotland international footballer

Climate
Fort William has an oceanic climate (Cfb) with moderate, but generally cool, temperatures and abundant precipitation. Fort William is one of the wettest locations in the British Isles with December being the wettest month.

Notes

References

See also
Belford Hospital

External links

 Map of Ft William and area, dated 1710
 

 
Towns in Highland (council area)
Populated places in Lochaber
Forts in Scotland